Serafino Dante "Foge" Fazio (February 28, 1938 – December 2, 2009) was an American football player and coach.  He served as the head football coach at the University of Pittsburgh from 1982 to 1985.  Fazio was an assistant coach with five teams in the National Football League (NFL) between 1988 and 2002.

Fazio played linebacker and center at the University of Pittsburgh, and was drafted by the Boston Patriots of the American Football League, but never played professionally.  He returned to Coraopolis, Pennsylvania, where he grew up, to begin his coaching career at the high school level, and then moved to the college ranks.  He was hired as head coach by his alma mater, Pitt in 1982, having previously been defensive coordinator under Jackie Sherrill, leading the team to a 25–18–3 record in four seasons before being fired. Several of Fazio's defenses have been acclaimed as some of the best units in college football history, particularly the #2-ranked 1980 team which featured several players who went on to have successful careers in the NFL, including Rickey Jackson, Bill Maas, Carlton Williamson, and Hugh Green, who finished second in the 1980 Heisman Trophy balloting.  After Fazio's stint as head coach at Pitt, Lou Holtz then hired him to serve as the defensive coordinator at the University of Notre Dame. At the college level, Fazio also coached at Boston University, Harvard University and the University of Cincinnati.

Fazio moved to the NFL in 1988, coaching for the Atlanta Falcons and New York Jets before becoming the defensive coordinator of the Minnesota Vikings in 1995.  He left the Vikings in 1999 and spent a year as the linebackers coach of the Washington Redskins before his hiring as the defensive coordinator of the Cleveland Browns in 2001.  He retired from the Browns in 2003, but was hired as a defensive consultant by Mike Tice of the Vikings in the 2005 season.

Following his retirement from coaching he did color commentary for the radio broadcast of Pitt football games during the 2008 and 2009 seasons. Fazio died on December 2, 2009 at the age of 71, as the result of a long bout with leukemia.

Head coaching record

References

1938 births
2009 deaths
American football centers
American football linebackers
Atlanta Falcons coaches
Boston University Terriers football coaches
Cincinnati Bearcats football coaches
Cleveland Browns coaches
Harvard Crimson football coaches
Minnesota Vikings coaches
New York Jets coaches
Notre Dame Fighting Irish football coaches
Pittsburgh Panthers football players
Pittsburgh Panthers football coaches
Washington Redskins coaches
High school football coaches in Pennsylvania
People from Coraopolis, Pennsylvania
People from Harrison County, West Virginia
Coaches of American football from Pennsylvania
Players of American football from Pennsylvania
American people of Italian descent
Deaths from cancer in Pennsylvania
Deaths from leukemia